John Francis Young  (14 January 1893 – 7 November 1929) was a Canadian soldier who served in the First World War. Young was a recipient of the Victoria Cross, the highest award for gallantry in the face of the enemy that can be awarded to British and Commonwealth forces. Young was one of the seven Canadians who were awarded the Victoria Cross for their actions on one single day, 2 September 1918, for actions across the 30 km long Drocourt-Quéant Line near Arras, France. The other six were Bellenden Hutcheson, Arthur George Knight, William Metcalf, Claude Joseph Patrick Nunney, Cyrus Wesley Peck and Walter Leigh Rayfield.

Early life
John Francis Young was born in Kidderminster, England on 14 January 1893. He was the son of Robert Charles Young and Mary Ann Cooper. He had two brothers: Robert Peart Young born in 1896 and Reginald H. Young born 1903.  He emigrated to Canada before World War I and worked in Montreal as a packer for Imperial Tobacco.

Victoria Cross
John Francis Young was 25 years old, and a private in the 87th (Canadian Grenadier Guards) Battalion, Canadian Expeditionary Force during the First World War when he performed the deed for which he was awarded the Victoria Cross.

On 2 September 1918 in the Dury-Arras Sector, France, when his company had suffered heavy casualties, Private Young, a stretcher-bearer, went forward to dress the wounded in open ground swept by machine-gun and rifle fire. He did this for over an hour displaying absolute fearlessness, and on more than one occasion, having used up all his stock of dressings, he made his way to company headquarters for a further supply before returning to the battlefield. Later in the day he organised and led stretcher-bearers to bring in the wounded whom he had dressed. He spent a full hour rescuing well over a dozen men.

Mustard gas was present in the battle which damaged one of Young's lungs. This later contributed to his contracting tuberculosis.

The citation reads:

He received his Victoria Cross from King George V at Buckingham Palace on 30 April 1919.

Later life
After the war, Young continued to serve in the Regiment, rising to the rank of Sergeant. He subsequently returned to his old job in Montreal. Some years later he developed tuberculosis and was admitted to a sanatorium in Sainte-Agathe-des-Monts, Quebec, where he died on 7 November 1929. He was buried in Mount Royal Cemetery, Montreal.  His grave, marked with a somewhat weather-worn headstone, is in Section L/2, plot 2019.

Legacy
The Canadian Grenadier Guards' Junior Ranks mess has been renamed the "John Francis Young Club" in his honour and still bears his name. In Young's honour, members are required to execute a proper halt, briefly coming to attention, upon entering the Club. There is a memorial plaque to him in the Sergeants' mess. He is remembered still and honoured as one of the outstanding heroes of the Regiment's history.

The Medal
His VC is held by the Canadian War Museum in Ottawa, Ontario.

References

External links 
 John Francis Young's digitized service file
 Legion Magazine article
 List of Canadian Victoria Cross recipients

1893 births
1929 deaths
People from Kidderminster
Canadian Expeditionary Force soldiers
Canadian military personnel of World War I
Canadian World War I recipients of the Victoria Cross
20th-century deaths from tuberculosis
Tuberculosis deaths in Quebec
English emigrants to Canada
Burials at Mount Royal Cemetery
Canadian Grenadier Guards soldiers
Canadian Army soldiers
Canadian Grenadier Guards
Military personnel from Worcestershire